Jiraiya the Hero is a 1921 Japanese silent short film directed by Shōzō Makino.

Cast 
Matsunosuke Onoe as Jiraiya
Suminojo Ichikawa as Orochimaru
Kijaku Otani as Tsukikagegunryo Miyukinosuke
Chosei Kataoka as Tsunatehime
Shoen Kataoka as Takasago Yuminosuke
Enichiro Jitsukawa
Ichitaro Kataoka
Masatada Makino

External links 

1921 films
Japanese-language films
Japanese black-and-white films
Japanese silent short films
1921 short films
1920s Japanese films